The Southern Line is an electrified commuter rail line running south from Alsancak Terminal in Izmir to Torbalı operated by İZBAN, using trackage owned by the Turkish State Railways. The route services the densely populated areas of western Buca and central Gaziemir as well as Adnan Menderes International Airport via the rebuilt airport station. Between 2010 and 2016 the southern terminus of the line was Cumaovası near Menderes.

All stations are wheelchair accessible with elevators.

The Southern Line has carried approximately 1 million passengers in the first six months from opening and carries an average 40,500 passengers daily, making it the busiest commuter rail line in Turkey, surpassing the Haydarpaşa-Gebze Commuter Line in İstanbul that held the record for over 30 years.

Route
The Southern Line starts at Alsancak Terminal in Alsancak. From there it continues south (crossing the tracks to Basmane at the famous Hilal Cross) towards Kemer and then traverses the southern hills of Kadifekale. At Şirinyer, the tracks enter the Şirinyer Tunnel, where it stops at Şirinyer station. After exiting the tunnel, the line goes through Buca, under the Karabağlar Intersection and into Gaziemir. After Gaziemir, the line stops at Adnan Menderes Airport and then leaves the city limits to its final destination; Cumaovası.

Stations
İzmir Alsancak Terminal – Turkish State Railways
Hilal- Transfer to Izmir Metro
Kemer
Şirinyer
Koşu
İnkılap
Semt Garajı
Esbaş
Gaziemir – Turkish State Railways
Sarnıç
Adnan Menderes – Turkish State Railways
Cumaovası – Turkish State Railways
Develi
Tekeli
Pancar
Kuşçuburun
Torbalı – Turkish State Railways
Tepeköy
Sağlık
Selçuk

Gallery

References

İZBAN
Rapid transit in Turkey
Railway lines in Turkey
Standard gauge railways in Turkey